Michael Carruth (born 9 July 1967) is a southpaw Irish Olympic boxer from Dublin. He is best known for winning the welterweight gold medal at the 1992 Summer Olympics in Barcelona. He turned Pro in 1994 but retired in 2000.

Amateur boxing
Olympic results

1988 Olympics Lightweight Boxing
1st round bye
Defeated Satoru Higashi (Japan) 5-0
Lost to George Scott (Sweden) KO by 1

1992 Olympics Welterweight Boxing
Round of 32: bye
Round of 16: Defeated Mikaele Masoe (American Samoa) on points, 11-2
Quarter-final: Defeated Andreas Otto (Germany) on points, 35-22
Semi-final: Defeated Arkhom Chenglai (Thailand) on points, 11-4
Final: Defeated Juan Hernández Sierra (Cuba) on points, 13-10

Carruth's medal was Ireland's first ever gold medal in boxing, only a couple of hours after teammate Wayne McCullough had to settle for the silver in bantamweight. It was also the first Olympic gold medal for Ireland since Ronnie Delaney won the Men's 1500m event at the 1956 Olympic Games in Melbourne.

Within a few days of Carruth winning his Olympic medal the Government of Ireland announced that Carruth has been instantly promoted to sergeant within the Irish Army in recognition of his achievement at the Olympics. And, on the day of his return to Ireland, local pubs dropped the price of beer to that of 1956.

Professional boxing
Carruth turned pro in 1994 after taking leave from his job as a soldier in the Irish Army. He was trained by former Irish boxing great Steve Collins. He had limited success as a pro, losing in both of his defining pro bouts; in 1997 against Mihai Leu for the WBO Welterweight title and in 2000 against Adrian Stone for the IBO Light Middleweight title. He retired in 2000, after the loss to Stone, with a career professional record of 18-3-0.

Media
In 2006, he competed on the TV series Celebrity Jigs 'n' Reels.

Carruth has been an expert boxing analyst for RTÉ's Olympic coverage in 2008, 2012 and 2016.

In 2020, Carruth appeared in the fourth season of the Irish edition of Dancing with the Stars. Carruth and his professional partner, Karen Byrne, were eliminated on 3 February 2020.

Involvement in Gaelic games
During his short spell as senior Westmeath county football team manager, Brendan Hackett appointed Carruth as masseur in 2009.

References

External links
 

1967 births
Living people
AIBA World Boxing Championships medalists
Boxers at the 1988 Summer Olympics
Boxers at the 1992 Summer Olympics
Irish Army soldiers
Irish male boxers
Medalists at the 1992 Summer Olympics
Olympic boxers of Ireland
Olympic gold medalists for Ireland
Olympic medalists in boxing
Sportspeople from Dublin (city)
RTÉ Sports Person of the Year winners
Sports masseurs
Welterweight boxers
Westmeath county football team